Lycoris squamigera, the resurrection lily or surprise lily, is a plant in the amaryllis family, Amaryllidaceae, subfamily Amaryllidoideae.  It is also sometimes referred to as naked ladies (a name used for several other plants). It is native to SE China and Korea

Description
Lycoris squamigera  is an herbaceous plant with basal, simple leaves, which are not present when the flowers emerge from the crown. The leaves sprout and grow in the spring, then die back during June; flowers appear in late July or early August. The flowers are white or pink and fragrant.  The flowers spring dramatically from the ground in mid to late summer; it usually takes only four to five days from first emergence to full bloom.  This suddenness is reflected in its common names: surprise lily, magic lily, and resurrection lily.

See also

 List of plants known as lily

References

Amaryllidoideae
Flora of China
Flora of Japan
Flora of Korea
Flora of Jiangsu
Flora of Shandong
Flora of Zhejiang
Garden plants
Plants described in 1885